Slim Carter is a 1957 American comedy film directed by Richard Bartlett and written by Montgomery Pittman. The film stars Jock Mahoney, Julie Adams, Tim Hovey, William Hopper, Ben Johnson and Joanna Moore. The film was released on October 2, 1957, by Universal-International Pictures.

Plot
Clover Doyle discovers an unpleasant singing cowboy Hughie Mack, and begins promoting him as the renamed Slim Carter.  An orphan boy wins a contest to spend time with Mack/Carter, and good qualities begin to emerge.

Cast        
Jock Mahoney as Slim Carter aka Hugh Mack
Julie Adams as Clover Doyle
Tim Hovey as Leo Gallaher
William Hopper as Joe Brewster
Ben Johnson as Montana Burriss
Joanna Moore as Charlene Carroll
Walter Reed as Richard L. Howard
Margaret Field as Hat Check Girl 
Bill Williams as Frank Hanneman
Barbara Hale as Allie Hanneman

References

External links
 

1957 films
American comedy films
1957 comedy films
Films directed by Richard Bartlett
Films scored by Herman Stein
Universal Pictures films
1950s English-language films
1950s American films